The 1995 Northeast Conference baseball tournament was held in May 1995 at Moody Park in Ewing Township, New Jersey.  The league's top four teams competed in the double elimination tournament.  Top-seeded  won their second of three consecutive tournament championships.  They then lost a play-in series to Penn for the right to play in the 1995 NCAA Division I baseball tournament.

Seeding and format
The top four finishers were seeded one through four based on conference regular-season winning percentage.  They played a double-elimination tournament.

Bracket

Most Valuable Player
Lou Deman of Long Island was named Tournament Most Valuable Player.

References

Tournament
Northeast Conference Baseball Tournament
Northeast Conference baseball tournament
Northeast Conference baseball tournament